JioMart is an Indian e-commerce company, headquartered in Navi Mumbai, Maharashtra, India, that started as a joint venture between Reliance Retail and Jio Platforms. The company initially focused on online groceries sales before expanding into other product categories such as fashion, home essentials, and lifestyle products.

The platform was soft-launched in December 2019. A pilot was initially launched in select areas of Navi Mumbai, Thane and Kalyan in April 2020. In May 2020, JioMart was fully launched in 200 cities and towns across India.
Within only a few days of its launch, the JioMart app surpassed one million downloads.

In October 2020, JioMart signed an agreement with Infibeam Avenues. Under this deal, Jio will use Infibeam's solutions to power its e-commerce and digital payments services.

In August 2022, JioMart signed an agreement with Facebook to launch first-ever end-to-end shopping experience on WhatsApp. Under this deal, Jio will use WhatsApp's chat solutions to power its grocery shopping service in India.

See also
List of online grocers

References

Reliance Industries subsidiaries
Jio
Reliance Retail
Online grocers
Indian companies established in 2019
Retail companies established in 2019
Internet properties established in 2019
Online retailers of India
Companies based in Mumbai
2019 establishments in Maharashtra